This is an unofficial list of UNESCO World Heritage Sites around the world by the religion they are associated with. While some sites have had their religious affiliation changed at various points throughout history, this list categorizes sites by their most recent affiliation. Also, not all of the following sites are functioning as places of worship.
UNESCO does not endorse classification by religion, which would be inconsistent with the universal value of these sites as "world heritage".

Buddhist World Heritage Sites 
 Angkor Wat, Cambodia
 Borobudur Temple Compounds, Indonesia
 Buddhist Monuments in the Hōryū-ji Area, Japan

Christian World Heritage Sites

Catholic Sites 
 Aachen Cathedral, Germany
 Abbey and Altenmünster of Lorsch, Germany
 Abbey Church of Saint-Savin sur Gartempe, France
 Amiens Cathedral, France
 Arab-Norman Palermo and the Cathedral Churches of Cefalù and Monreale, Italy
 Archaeological Area and the Patriarchal Basilica of Aquileia, Italy
 Assisi, the Basilica of San Francesco and Other Franciscan Sites, Italy
 Baroque Churches of the Philippines, Philippines
 Benedictine Convent of St John at Müstair, Switzerland
 Bourges Cathedral, France
 Burgos Cathedral, Spain
 Carolingian Westwork and Civitas Corvey, Germany
 Catalan Romanesque Churches of the Vall de Boí, Spain
 Cathedral, Alcázar and Archivo de Indias in Seville, Spain
 Cathedral of Notre-Dame, Former Abbey of Saint-Rémi and Palace of Tau, Reims, France
 Cathedral, Torre Civica and Piazza Grande, Modena, Italy
 Chartres Cathedral, France
 Church and Dominican Convent of Santa Maria delle Grazie with "The Last Supper" by Leonardo da Vinci, Italy
 Churches of Chiloé, Chile
 Cistercian Abbey of Fontenay, France
 Cologne Cathedral, Germany
 Convent of Christ in Tomar, Portugal
 Convent of St Gall, Switzerland
 Early Christian Monuments of Ravenna, Italy
 Episcopal Complex of the Euphrasian Basilica in the Historic Centre of Poreč, Croatia
 Historic Centre of Avignon: Papal Palace, Episcopal Ensemble and Avignon Bridge, France
 Historic Centre of Rome, the Properties of the Holy See in that City Enjoying Extraterritorial Rights, and San Paolo Fuori le Mura, Italy and Vatican City
 Jesuit Missions of Chiquitos, Bolivia
 Jesuit Missions of the Guaranis: San Ignacio Miní, Santa Ana, Nuestra Señora de Loreto and Santa María Mayor (Argentina), Ruins of São Miguel das Missões (Brazil)
 Jesuit Missions of La Santísima Trinidad de Paraná and Jesús de Tavarangue, Paraguay
 Late Baroque Churches of the Val di Noto, Italy
 León Cathedral, Nicaragua
 Maulbronn Monastery, Germany
 Monastic Island of Reichenau, Germany
 Monastery and Site of the Escorial, Madrid, Spain
 Monastery of Alcobaça, Portugal
 Monastery of Batalha, Portugal
 Monastery of the Hieronymites and Tower of Belém in Lisbon, Portugal
 Notre-Dame Cathedral in Tournai, Belgium
 Old Town of Ávila with its Extra-Muros Churches, Spain
 Piazza del Duomo, Pisa, Italy
 Pilgrimage Church of Wies, Germany
 Poblet Monastery, Spain
 Protective town of San Miguel de Allende and the Sanctuary of Jesús Nazareno de Atotonilco, Mexico
 Roman Monuments, Cathedral of St Peter and Church of Our Lady in Trier, Germany
 Routes of Santiago de Compostela: Camino Francés and Routes of Northern Spain, Spain
 Routes of Santiago de Compostela in France, France
 Monastery of Santa María de Guadalupe, Spain
 Sacri Monti of Piedmont and Lombardy, Italy
 San Antonio Missions, United States
 Sanctuary of Bom Jesus do Congonhas, Brazil
 Sanctuary of Bom Jesus do Monte in Braga, Portugal
 San Millán Yuso and Suso Monasteries, Spain
 Santhome Church in Chennai, India
 Sceilg Mhichíl, Ireland
 Speyer Cathedral, Germany
 St Mary's Cathedral and St Michael's Church at Hildesheim, Germany
 Studley Royal Park including the Ruins of Fountains Abbey, United Kingdom
 Šibenik Cathedral, Croatia
 The Sassi and the Park of the Rupestrian Churches of Matera, Italy
 Vatican City
 Vézelay, Church and Hill, France

Eastern Orthodox Sites 
 Gelati Monastery, Georgia
 Historical Monuments of Mtskheta, Georgia
 Medieval Monuments in Kosovo, Serbia and Kosovo
 Monasteries of Daphni, Hosios Loukas and Nea Moni of Chios, Greece
 Mount Athos, Greece
 Paleochristian and Byzantine Monuments of Thessalonika, Greece
 Studenica Monastery, Serbia
 The Historic Centre (Chorá) with the Monastery of Saint-John the Theologian and the Cave of the Apocalypse on the Island of Pátmos

Protestant Sites 
 Canterbury Cathedral, St Augustine's Abbey, and St Martin's Church, United Kingdom
 Christiansfeld, a Moravian Church Settlement, Denmark
 Durham Castle and Cathedral, United Kingdom
 Church Village of Gammelstad, Luleå, Sweden
 Naumburg Cathedral, Germany
 Petäjävesi Old Church, Finland
 Roskilde Cathedral, Denmark
 Urnes Stave Church, Norway
 St Mary's Cathedral and St Michael's Church at Hildesheim, Germany

Hindu World Heritage Sites 

 Angkor Wat, Cambodia
 Pashupati Temple Nepal
 Muktainath Temple Nepal 
 Guheswari Temple Nepal 
 Gadhi mai Temple Nepal 
 Airavatesvara Temple
 Anegundi
 Brihadisvara Temple, Gangaikonda Cholapuram
 Brihadisvara Temple, Thanjavur
 Chaturbhuj Temple (Khajuraho)
 Devi Jagadambi Temple
 Duladeo Temple
 Elephanta Caves
 Ellora Caves
 Great Living Chola Temples
 Group of Monuments at Mahabalipuram
 Hampi
 Javari Temple, Khajuraho
 Kailasa temple, Ellora
 Khajuraho Group of Monuments
 Konark Sun Temple
 Lakshmana Temple, Khajuraho
 Lakshmi Temple, Khajuraho
 Mamallapuram
 Nanda Devi
 Nandi Temple, Khajuraho India
 Parvati Temple, Khajuraho
 Pattadakal
 Prambanan
 Vamana Temple, Khajuraho
 Varaha Temple, Khajuraho
 :Category:Hampi

Muslim World Heritage Sites 
 Jameh Mosque of Isfahan, Iran
 Selimiye Mosque and its Social Complex, Turkey
 Mosque City of Bagerhat, Bangladesh
 Qutb Minar, India
 Islamic Cairo, Egypt
 Samarra Archaeological City, Iraq
 Ancient Ksour of Ouadane, Chinguetti, Tichitt and Oualata, Mauritania
 Kairouan, Tunisia
 Casbah of Algiers, Algeria
 Great Mosque of Djenné, Mali

Notes

References

 Religion
World Heritage Sites